Władysław Gędłek (born 15 June 1920 in Kraków; died by suicide 28 February 1954, also in Kraków) was a Polish soccer player, right defender, represented both Cracovia and Polish National Team.

Club career
His first team was Krowodrza Kraków, where Gedlek's career started in 1935. During World War II, participated in secret games in Kraków, as the German occupiers banned Poles from playing all sports. In 1945 he moved to Cracovia, where he played until 1953, winning Championships of Poland in 1948.

Regarded as a very talented and skilled player. Tough in defence, active in offence, often initiated dangerous attacks on opponents. In late 1940s Poland Gedlek had the status of a celebrity, and his immense talent was appreciated not only in his native country. As the first Pole ever he was called to the FIFA's official "World Team’’, to a friendly game in 1953.

International career
Represented Poland in 20 games (1949–1953), also played in both Poland's games of the 1952 Summer Olympics.

References

1920 births
1954 suicides
Polish footballers
MKS Cracovia (football) players
Olympic footballers of Poland
Footballers at the 1952 Summer Olympics
Footballers from Kraków
Suicides in Poland
Association football fullbacks
Poland international footballers